Pleasanton may refer to:

Places
 Pleasanton, California
 Pleasanton, Iowa
 Pleasanton, Kansas
 Pleasanton, Nebraska
 Pleasanton, New Mexico
 Pleasanton, Ohio
 Pleasanton, Texas
 Pleasanton Township, Michigan

Other
 Pleasanton High School (disambiguation)

See also
 Pleasonton (disambiguation)